Frances Elizabeth Hoggan (née Morgan; 20 December 1843 – 5 February 1927) was a Welsh doctor and in 1870 became the first woman from the UK to receive a doctorate in medicine from any university in Europe. She was a pioneering medical practitioner, researcher and social reformer – and the first female doctor to be registered in Wales. She and her husband opened the first husband-and-wife medical practice in Britain. She was honoured with Wales' 11th Purple Plaque in her birth-town of Brecon in March 2023.

Early life and education
Frances Hoggan was born in Brecon, Wales, where her father, Richard Morgan, was a curate.  She was brought up and educated at Cowbridge in Glamorgan and later at Windsor. During her teens, she gave birth to an illegitimate daughter, who was brought up with her mother and passed off as Frances' sister.  She went on to study at Paris and Düsseldorf.

Upon the exclusion of women by the Council of the Worshipful Society of Apothecaries from its professional exams in 1867, Morgan sought her medical education at the University of Zurich, whence Nadezhda Suslova, Russia's first woman physician, had received her degree in December 1867. There, Morgan completed the medical course in three years rather than the expected five, and in March 1870, became only the second woman to gain an MD (with a thesis on progressive muscular atrophy) at Zürich University. Afterwards, at a clinic in Vienna she undertook study on operative midwifery and became a pupil of surgeon Gustav Braun.

She obtained her medical doctorate from the University of Zurich in March 1870, completing the six-year course in three years, becoming the first British woman to obtain a European MD degree.

Career
Following her graduation, Frances did post-graduate work at top medical schools in Vienna, Prague and Paris before returning to Britain. She spent several years as a medical practitioner working with Elizabeth Garrett Anderson at the New Hospital for Women in London. She also helped to found the National Health Society with Elizabeth Blackwell in 1871. Its purpose was to "promote health amongst all classes of the population."
 
In 1874, she married Dr George Hoggan. She obtained her licence to practice in the UK from The King’s and Queen’s College of Physicians of Ireland in February 1877.

Together with her husband, she opened the first husband-and-wife general medical practice in the UK. They both wrote medical research papers over the next decade, some of which were co-authored.

In 1882, she called for a publicly funded women's medical service for female patients in India. This helped pave the way for the Dufferin Fund. In the same year she became medical superintendent at the North London Collegiate School, one of the first rigorously academic secondary schools for girls. She held this role for six years.

She wrote a paper, in 1884, called 'The Position of the Mother of the Family', using the latest understanding about conception and reproduction to argue that mothers should have more rights over their children.

Frances and her husband George were anti-vivisectionists and opponents of compulsory vaccination. In an article for the Vaccination Inquirer in September 1883 they both argued against compulsory vaccination. Frances' husband George became ill in 1885 and the couple moved to the south of France. George died of a cerebral tumour in 1891.

Hoggan became a campaigner and social reformer, and toured the United States lecturing. She had a particular interest in racial issues, and was a speaker at the Universal Race Congress in London in 1911.

Death and legacy
Frances died in 1927. Her cremated remains are buried, with her husband's, in Woking cemetery.

The Learned Society of Wales awards the Frances Hoggan Medal to outstanding women connected with Wales in the areas of science, medicine, engineering, technology or mathematics.

On 3 March 2023 a plaque was placed at the birthplace in Brecon to celebrate Hoggan, with Wales' 11th purple plaque placed to celebrate remarkable women in Wales. Welsh government's social justice minister, Jane Hutt, said she hoped the plaque would "make sure her name is elevated to the status she deserves".

Selected works
initiative which Education for Girls in Wales (1882)
American Negro Women During Their First Fifty Years of Freedom (1913)

See also

Welsh 
 Mary Elizabeth Phillips (physician)
 Mary Morris (doctor)
 List of Welsh medical pioneers

Other 
 Elizabeth Blackwell
 Elizabeth Garrett Anderson
 Nadezhda Suslova
 Edinburgh Seven

References

Bibliography
 M. A. Elston, "Hoggan, Frances Elizabeth (1843–1927)", Oxford Dictionary of National Biography, Oxford University Press, 2004 accessed 4 May 2007
McIntyre, N. "Britain's first medical marriage: Frances Morgan (1843–1927), George Hoggan (1837–1891) and the mysterious "Elsie"." Journal of Medical Biography, 12:2 (2004), 105–14. Publisher: Royal Society of Medicine. .

External links
Biography at BBC Wales

1843 births
1927 deaths
19th-century Welsh medical doctors
Welsh women medical doctors
People from Brecon
20th-century Welsh medical doctors
Anti-vivisectionists
British social reformers
Burials in Surrey
20th-century women physicians
19th-century women physicians
19th-century British non-fiction writers
20th-century British non-fiction writers
19th-century British women writers
20th-century British women writers